{{DISPLAYTITLE:Prostaglandin E1}}

Prostaglandin E1 (PGE1), also known as alprostadil, is a naturally occurring prostaglandin which is used as a medication. In infants with congenital heart defects, it is delivered by slow injection into a vein to open the ductus arteriosus until surgery can be carried out. By injection into the penis or placement in the urethra, it is used to treat erectile dysfunction.

Common side effects when given to babies include decreased breathing, fever, and low blood pressure. When used for erectile dysfunction side effects may include penile pain, bleeding at the site of injection, and prolonged erection (priapism). Prostaglandin E1 is in the vasodilator family of medications. It works by opening blood vessels and relaxing smooth muscle.

Prostaglandin E1 was isolated in 1957 and approved for medical use in the United States in 1981. It is on the World Health Organization's List of Essential Medicines.

Medical uses

Patent ductus arteriosus 

Alprostadil is also used in maintaining a patent ductus arteriosus in newborns. This is primarily useful when the threat of premature closure of the ductus arteriosus exists in an infant with ductal-dependent congenital heart disease, including cyanotic lesions (e.g., hypoplastic left heart syndrome,  pulmonary atresia/stenosis, tricuspid atresia/stenosis, transposition of the great arteries) and acyanotic lesions (e.g., coarctation of the aorta, critical aortic stenosis, and interrupted aortic arch).

Sexual dysfunction 
Alprostadil is sold in the United States as urethral suppositories and in injectable form.  The suppositories are sold under the brand name Muse. The injectable forms are Edex and Caverject.  Muse delivers alprostadil as a penile suppository, inserted into the urethra, at least ten minutes before the erection is needed. Caverject and Edex are similarly fast-acting, but instead are injected by syringe directly into the corpus cavernosum of the penis.

Alprostadil is also available as a generic. The major cost is that it must be mixed by a compounding pharmacy and supplies may be difficult to obtain. The different formulations, including Bimix and Trimix, may include papaverine and/or phentolamine. A typical mix might be 30 mg of papaverine, 2 mg of phentolamine, and  20 μg alprostadil.  As a generic, it is much less expensive than the packaged injectables. It is premixed and must be kept refrigerated and the user must load a syringe with the quantity needed.Most recently, the compound has been made easily accessible in an applicable topical cream form known as Vitaros. Made by Takeda UK Ltd, it is now available in Europe and contains either 200 or 300 micrograms of alprostadil in 100 mg of cream which is directly administered as a topical cream applied to the urethra in a preloaded delivery device. The tip of the device is placed in the urethral meatus and the cream delivered into the urethra. Clinical trials for the treatment showed positive results in over 3000 men that it was tested on, and unlike other sexual dysfunction medication, it is said to be usable by men with diabetes or heart problems and those who have undergone a prostatectomy. It has no known interactions with food, alcohol or other medications making it safer than other treatments containing alprostadil. Similarly to the Bimix and Trimix injections though, it must be kept under cool temperatures.

Critical limb ischemia 
Prostanoids, including alprostadil, do not reduce the risk of limb amputation but may offer a slight improvement in rest-pain and leg ulcer healing in persons with critical limb ischemia.

Contrast-induced nephropathy 
Preventative administration of alprostadil may reduce the risk of kidney injury (specifically contrast-induced nephropathy) in persons having cardiac angiography or percutaneous coronary intervention.

Adverse effects 

 Accidental injury (Muse only)
 Apnea
 Bleeding:
 Cerebral
 Urethral
 Bradycardia
 Cardiac arrest
 Congestive heart failure
 Cortical proliferation of long bones
 Diarrhea
 Disseminated intravascular coagulation
 Edema
 Fever
 Flushing
 Hyperemia
 Hypotension
 Injection-site haematoma
 Injection-site ecchymosis (Caverject only)
 Pain:
 Back
 Pelvic
 Penile
 Testicular (Muse only)
 Urethral
 Prolonged erection
 Penile fibrosis
 Second-degree heart block
 Seizures
 Sepsis
 Shock
 Spasm of right ventricle infundibulum
 Supraventricular tachycardia
 Tachycardia
 Ventricular fibrillation
 Urethral burning
 Uterine rupture

Biosynthesis

Prostaglandin E1 is biosynthesized on an as-needed basis from dihomo-γ-linolenic acid (an omega-6 fatty acid) in healthy humans without coronary artery disease and/or a genetic disorder.

Other versions
Misoprostol is another synthetic prostaglandin E1 analog used to prevent gastric ulcers when taken on a continuous basis, to treat missed miscarriage, to induce labor, and to induce abortion.

References

External links
 

Alkene derivatives
Carboxylic acids
Erectile dysfunction drugs
Ketones
Prostaglandins
Secondary alcohols
World Health Organization essential medicines
Wikipedia medicine articles ready to translate